Nick Taussig (born 26 March 1973) is a British author and film producer. In his writing he is known for exploring themes of personal freedom, identity, truth and moral transgression in works such as Love and Mayhem (2005), Don Don (2007), Gorilla Guerrilla (2008) and The Distinguished Assassin (2013).

He was educated at Rokeby School and Dulwich College. After graduating from Durham University with a First Class degree in Philosophy and Literature, he went on to UCL School of Slavonic and East European Studies where he completed a Master's in Russian Literature. Taussig initially worked in film before writing his first novel in 2005. He married the Czech artist Klara Cecmanova in 2010. He is also co-founder of The Mtaala Foundation, an education partnership and sponsorship program to create and support a school for vulnerable children and at-risk youth in Uganda; and a trustee of Harrison's Fund, a medical research charity committed to getting as much money as possible into the hands of the world's best researchers, who are working to find a cure for Duchenne muscular dystrophy, a fatal genetic disease.

Writing 
In Taussig's fiction, common perceptions of human nature are challenged, the writer exploring themes of love, sexual desire, insanity, poverty, violence and death, the last of which he discussed when he appeared at the Hay Festival on 9 June 2007. Taussig confronts his readers with shocking aspects of humanity, intending to force them to reflect and reevaluate.

Taussig's first novel, Love and Mayhem, received significant critical acclaim. Paul Blezard described it as "an absolutely stunning debut novel. It is for the lovelorn, and for those in love. It is just very well-written."  However, others responded less favourably to this "twisted tale of love set in a darker side of London", in the words of the literary critic Daneet Steffens. Writing in Time Out in the 31 August 2005 issue of the magazine, Steffens concluded that though the novel contains "sly plot twists and persuasive [characters] … some of it comes off as [no more than] cathartic release", though "whispers of promising novels – or movies – to come." In the writing of it, Taussig reportedly drew on his own experiences in his study of madness and the fine line between reason and unreason, this "adding a further edge to proceedings", according to the critic Kingsley Marshall, writing in Notion magazine in July 2005.

In his second book, Don Don, Taussig continued to explore uncompromising subject matter, in his depiction of "Don Holmes … a man with a string of failed marriages who's never happier than when he's hoovering up drugs, blowing away business competitors or getting blown by a couple of girls", according to Tom Boncza-Tomaszewski, writing in The Independent on Sunday on 4 March 2007. The critic described Taussig as "clearly a talented writer", but felt the novel "got polished so hard it lost its definition." Others, however, responded to it more positively, BBC's Marie-Louise Muir calling it a "remarkable book" and the critic Paul Blezard describing it as "pithy and funny, mature and intelligent." While writing Don Don, Taussig spent time both in America and Thailand, in an attempt to live as his fictional characters do, "going to extraordinary lengths in order to research [his] books", in the words of broadcaster Jamie Owen, who interviewed Taussig for BBC Radio Wales on 27 March 2007.

Taussig entered new territory with his third novel, Gorilla Guerrilla, a book that describes the relationship between a boy soldier and a silverback gorilla. In a feature for The Independent on Sunday on 8 December 2008, Taussig wrote about what inspired the novel, a meeting with "a 14-year-old with a pronounced limp and a heavy scar on the top of his head [whose] slight build and baby face belied the horror experienced in his short life. Before he'd even hit puberty he had shot enemy troops, looted villages and brutally murdered civilians – and all against his will." Influenced by the work of the contemporary philosopher John N. Gray, in particular Straw Dogs: Thoughts on Humans and Other Animals, the book, amongst other things, "renders the barriers that we erect between our species and others to protect our sense of uniqueness otiose", according to the poet Nicholas Green.

His most recent novel, The Distinguished Assassin, tells the story of Professor Aleksei Klebnikov, a persecuted intellectual's revenge against Russian Communists, which, according to Marcel Berlins writing in The Times on 8 June 2013, "is told in alternate chapters covering his time as prisoner and after his release. Through Klebnikov, the plight of the Russian people under Stalinist rule is grippingly demonstrated. Taussig's style – short on dialogue and long on descriptions and Klebnikov's thoughts – takes a bit of getting used to, but turns out to be effective for the passionate political and emotional content of his novel."

Published works

Fiction 
 Love and Mayhem (2005)
Don Don (2007)
 Gorilla Guerrilla (2008)
The Distinguished Assassin (2013)

Producing 
Taussig has produced feature films such as Stardust (2020), Audrey (2020), the double BAFTA nominee McQueen (2018), Churchill (2017), Lek and the Dogs (2017) and My Name Is Lenny (2017). He was also executive producer for the BAFTA-nominated political documentary, Taking Liberties (2007), a film about the erosion of Civil liberties in the United Kingdom and the increase of surveillance under the government of Tony Blair.

References

External links

Writing 
 Taussig, Nick. Huffington Post blog
Taussig, Nick. Our beautiful sons could die before us. An article Taussig wrote for The Guardian, 16 August 2014
Nick Taussig, Amazon' author's page
 Taussig, Nick. Innocence lost: The child soldiers forced to murder. An article Taussig wrote for The Independent, 8 December 2008, about child soldiers in Africa
 An Interview with Taussig on BBC Radio 2, 28 August 2008, discussing Gorilla Guerrilla
 An Interview with Taussig on BBC Radio Hereford & Worcester, 5 August 2008, discussing Gorilla Guerrilla
 An Interview with Taussig, broadcast on BBC Radio Wales, 27 March 2007, discussing Don Don
 An Interview with Taussig, broadcast on Between the Lines, Oneword, 1 March 2007, discussing Don Don
 An Interview with Taussig, broadcast on Arts Extra, BBC Radio Ulster, February 2007, discussing Don Don
 Taussig reading an extract from Don Don
 Taussig reading an extract from Love and Mayhem on Between the Lines, Oneword, 27 July 2005
 Taussig reading an extract from Love and Mayhem on BBC Radio Scotland, August 2005

Producing 
Nick Taussig
A review of Stardust in The Times, 29 October 2020
A feature on Audrey in The Guardian, 15 November 2020
A review of McQueen in ScreenDaily, 23 April 2018
A review of Churchill in The Telegraph, 14 June 2017
A review of Lek and the Dogs in The Guardian, 10 June 2018
 An article on Sket in The Independent , 17 May 2010
 A feature on Sket in The Independent , 7 August 2010
 A feature on British urban cinema in The Guardian , 10 March 2011

1973 births
Living people
21st-century British novelists
British film producers
Alumni of University College London
Alumni of the UCL School of Slavonic and East European Studies
Alumni of Durham University
British male novelists
21st-century British male writers